Bloom Consulting is a consulting firm, specialized in Nation Branding.  It was founded in 2003 by José Filipe Torres. Bloom Consulting is currently represented in Spain, Portugal and Brasil. The company's work focuses mainly Nation branding and Place branding projects, including research for Tourism, Foreign Direct Investment and Public Diplomacy.

Media coverage and presentations 

Bloom Consulting has been covered in economic newspapers and magazines such as Forbes and The Economist.

The Bloom Consulting Country Brand Ranking 
Annually Bloom Consulting publishes the Bloom Consulting Country Brand Ranking, in two separate versions: Tourism and Trade. The Ranking determines the position of a country has according to its economic performance based on previous economic history.  The first ranking was made in summer 2011, examining 144 and 157 countries in trade and tourism field, respectively. The ranking uses dozens of variables in order to position the countries by facts and mathematical algorithms instead of pure opinions, like other country branding rankings do. The methodology measures the coherency between the external messages of a country and its actual economic performance. The higher a country is on the list, the better they are compared to their competitors, in positioning themselves to attract either Foreign Direct Investment or tourists.

Organization and administration 
Bloom Consulting SL. is a Spain-based company. It works with a country office system, meaning that offices are established in countries under a new legal structure with Bloom Consulting SL. as a stakeholder allowing individuals to join Bloom as a partner and opening a new country office after being trained by the Bloom Headquarters.

References

External links 
 Official website

Consulting firms established in 2003
Service companies of Spain
Branding companies